Elkton is an unincorporated community in St. Johns County, Florida, United States. It is located at the intersection of State Road 207 and County Road 305. The most prominent landmark is the Post Office, which delivers mail to the rural southwest section of the county.

Geography

References

Unincorporated communities in St. Johns County, Florida
Unincorporated communities in the Jacksonville metropolitan area
Unincorporated communities in Florida